The County of Diez (sometimes Dietz) was a county of the Holy Roman Empire, centred on the  at Diez in Lahngau (in the modern German states of Hesse and Rhineland-Palatinate). The county is first attested in 1073 and seems to have been created from the territory of the Conradine dynasty after they relocated to Swabia. The Counts rose to prominence in the second half of the twelfth century as close partisans of the Hohenstaufen dynasty. During this period, it was known as the "Golden County".

After the fall of the Hohenstaufens in 1254, the power of the Counts of Diez declined. The remaining County of Diez slowly pawned off territories to pay debts until 1388, when the County was inherited by Adolf I, Count of Nassau-Siegen after the death of the last count.

History 
The County was probably created as a successor to the original county of the Conradines in Niederlahngau, after they had shifted their centre of power from Franconia to Swabia. The Counts of Diez probably originated in the Nahe river valley and received the county on the Lahn river from the Salian dynasty as a fief, which then became hereditary.

A Count Embrichio is attested in Niederlahngau from 1059. His brother was probably Count Godebald, who is attested in Niederlahngau from 1053. Embricho, Bishop of Augsburg (1063-1077) was probably a close relative of Count Embricho.

Peak under the Hohenstaufens
Under the Hohenstaufens, especially Frederick Barbarossa, the counts reached the peak of their power. Probably as a result of a marriage to an heiress of the Nürings, Henry II of Diez (r. 1145-1189) inherited substantial possessions in the Wetterau. He accompanied Barbarossa on his Italian Campaigns and participated in diplomatic interactions there, as did his son Henry III. In 1207, Henry III and his brother Gerhard II ceded the Vogtei of Mainz-Kastel to King Philip of Swabia in exchange for imperial immediacy and patronage of the churches at Usingen. Gerhard II also belonged to the regency council of Henry (VII). Henry and Gerhard established the Stift at Salz as a dynastic foundation of the counts of Diez. It was incorporated into the collegiate church of Diez in 1289 by Count Gerhard VII.

The territory was known to contemporaries as the "Golden County". They held the right of the blood court at Altendiez, Flacht, Hahnstätten, Lindenholzhausen, Dauborn, Niederhadamar (Dehrner Zent), Hundsangen, Nentershausen, Meudt, Salz, Rotzenhahn, Hoen-Rennerod, Villmar, Schupbach, Panrod, Kirberg und Camberg, Elsoff, Blessenberg (Frickhofen) und Niederzeuzheim.

Decline 
After the end of the Hohenstaufen dynasty, the family lost their influence in Imperial politics. Economic problems followed, which forced the counts to sell off territories.

In 1302, the two lines finally split and formed separate counties. In 1326, the Weilnau line transferred its seat to Birstein in the Vogelsberg. Their territory in the Lahn river valley was mostly taken over by the House of Nassau.

In the following years, the Diez line, weakened  by the partition, lost several possessions and privileges, most of which were mortgaged to their more powerful neighbours, Nassau and the Electorate of Trier, as well as the County of Katzenelnbogen and the Lords of Eppstein. Count Gottfried (1303-1348) was ruled to be mentally incapable, so Emicho I, Count of Nassau-Hadamar assumed the guardianship of his fiefs from 1317 to 1332. After 1332, Gottfried's son Gerhard VI acted as regent until his death on 17 October 1343 during a conflict with Limburg.

Afterlife
The last Count of Diez, Gerhard VII, died in 1388. The remnant of the county passed via his daughter Jutta to his son-in-law, Adolf I, Count of Nassau-Siegen. At this point, a significant portion of the County was handed over to various creditors. When Adolf of Nassau-Siegen died in 1420 he also had no direct male heirs. Only half of Diez remained within the House of Nassau. The rest of the County passed vis Adolf's daughter, also called Jutta, to his son-in-law, Gottfried VII of Eppstein-Münzenberg. The House of Eppstein sold half of their portion to the Counts of Katzenelnbogen in 1453. When the counts of Katzenelnbogen died out in 1453, this quarter passed to the Landgraviate of Hesse, which surrendered it to Nassau-Dillenburg on 30 June 1557. The quarter that remained in the possession of the Counts of Eppstein went to the Electorate of Trier in 1535. In the Diez Treaty of 1564, Nassau-Dillenburg and the Electorate split the county between themselves.

The House of Nassau created a new county of Nassau-Dietz in 1606, from which the current royal family of the Netherlands is descended. The County of Nassau-Dietz itself was occupied by France in 1795 during the Napoleonic Wars and became part of the Duchy of Nassau in 1815.

Coats of Arms
The original coat of arms (according to seals from 1308 and 1346) depicts two golden Leopards on a red background. The helm is decorated with rays and red-gold mantling.
The later hereditary arms are the same, except that the helm is surmounted by a black headdress supporting a round red disc decorated with two golden leopards.

List of Counts 
Probably counts of Diez:
 Embricho (before 1059 - after 1073)
 Godebold (before 1053 - after 1073)

Counts of the Diez line:
 The brothers Henry I and Gerhard I (before 1101 - after 1107)
 Embricho II (before 1145)
 Henry II (1145–1189)
 The brothers Gerhard II (1189–1223) and Henry III (1189–1234); Henry founded the Weilnau line in 1208
 Gerhard III (1234–1276)
 Gerhard IV (1281–1306)
 The brothers Gerhard V (1301 – before 1308) and Gottfried (1303–1348)
 Gerhard VI (1317–17. October 1343)
 Gerhard VII (1347–1388)
 Jutta (1368–1397), married to Adolf I, Count of Nassau-Siegen

Counts of the Weilnau line:
 Henry III (1189–1234)
 The brothers Gerhard I (1274–1282) and Henry I (1249–1275)
 The brothers Henry II (1282–1344) and Reinhard I (1282–1333), sons of Gerhard I, and their cousin Henry III (1275–1307), son of Henry I
 Gerhard II (1360–1389), descendant of Reinhard I
 Henry IV (1389–1413)
 The brothers Adolf (1420–1451), Henry V (1426–before 1438) and Reinhard II (1424–1472)

Counts of Diez (Hesse)
The children of Landgrave Philip I of Hesse from his second, morganatic marriage to Margarethe von der Saale received the title "Counts of Diez" (in full, "Born of House Hesse, Counts of Diez, Lords of Lissberg and Bickenbach")
 Philip (1541–1569)
 Herman (1542–1568)
 Christopher Ernest (1543–1603)
 Margarita (1544–1608)
 Albert (1546–1569)
 Philip Conrad (1547–1569)
 Moritz (1553–1575)
 Ernest (1554–1570)
All seven sons died unmarried, without legitimate offspring. Margarita married John Bernhard, Count of Neu-Eberstein

References

Bibliography 
 Karl Ernst Demandt: Geschichte des Landes Hessen. 2nd edition, Kassel 1972 (pp. 405–410).
 Hellmuth Gensicke: Landesgeschichte des Westerwalds. Wiesbaden 1958.
 Hermann Heck. "Bilder aus der Geschichte der Grafschaft und der Stadt Diez." Zeitschrift für Heimatkunde des Regierungsbezirkes Coblenz und der angrenzenden Gebiete von Hessen-Nassau, Coblenz 1921. (Teil 1, Teil 2)
 Hermann Heck. "Die Entstehung der Grafschaft Diez und der Ursprung des Diezer Grafenhauses." Zeitschrift für Heimatkunde des Regierungsbezirkes Coblenz und der angrenzenden Gebiete von Hessen-Nassau, Coblenz 1921 (dilibri.de)
 Michael Hollmann and Michael Wettengel. Nassaus Beitrag für das heutige Hessen. Wiesbaden 1992 (pp. 15, 24–25).
 Klaus Eiler. "Politischer Umbruch an der unteren Lahn in den Grafschaften Katzenelnbogen und Diez im 16. Jahrhundert." Nassauische Annalen 1989, pp. 97–114.
 Wolf-Heino Struck. "Kircheninventare der Grafschaft Diez von 1525/26 und ihr zeitgeschichtlicher Hintergrund. Ein Beitrag zur Geschichte des landesherrlichen Kirchenregiments." Nassauische Annalen 1957, p. 58.

External links 
Literatur über County of Diez nach Register nach GND In: Hessische Bibliographie
 Wappen der Grafen von Dietz in Siebmachers Wappenbuch von 1701, Band 2, Tafel 17 (seitenverkehrt)

Diez
Rhein-Lahn-Kreis
Diez
Diez
History of the Westerwald